Giulio Bosca (born 6 September 1990) is an Italian World Cup alpine ski racer who won three medals at the Winter Universiade.

He is brother of Guglielmo, himself a high level alpine skier.

Biography
In 2021, still in the midst of his competitive activity, on 8 February he had won a FIS giant slalom race in Les Gets in France, he was called by RAI to replace Paolo De Chiesa, who fell ill with COVID-19, as technical commentator for the races of the Cortina 2021 ski world championships.

European Cup results
Podium

National titles
Italian Alpine Ski Championships
Giant slalom: 2017, 2018

References

External links
 

1990 births
Living people
Italian male alpine skiers
Sportspeople from Turin
Alpine skiers of Gruppo Sportivo Esercito
Medalists at the 2013 Winter Universiade
Medalists at the 2015 Winter Universiade
Medalists at the 2017 Winter Universiade
21st-century Italian people